The following is a list of episodes of the British police procedural television drama series Prime Suspect, which stars Helen Mirren as Jane Tennison. As one of the first female detective chief inspectors in Greater London's Metropolitan Police Service, she eventually rises to rank of detective superintendent while confronting the institutionalised sexism that exists within the police force.

Series overview

Episodes

Series 1 (1991)

Series 2 (1992)

Series 3 (1993)

Series 4 (1995)

Series 5 (1996)

Series 6 (2003)

Series 7 (2006)

References

External links
 
 
 
 
 
 
 
 
 

Lists of British crime drama television series episodes
Lists of British crime television series episodes
Works about the Serbian Mafia